The Sky Hawk is a 1929 American pre-Code adventure film, produced and distributed by Fox Film Corporation and directed by John G. Blystone. The screenplay was adapted by Llewellyn Hughes from his article "Chap Called Bardell" and novelized by Guy Fowler. The film stars John Garrick, Helen Chandler and Gilbert Emery.

Plot

World War I British aviator Jack Bardell (John Garrick) is discharged from the service after a suspicious aircraft crash that his fellow pilots believe show that he was a coward in the face of the enemy. He is left temporarily paralyzed from the waist down, and enlists the aid of his mechanic Tom Berry (Billy Bevan) to rebuild a wrecked fighter aircraft. Bardell recuperates to the extent that he is able to fly again, redeeming himself during a German Zeppelin attack over London, bringing down one of the airships.

Cast

 John Garrick as Jack Bardell
 Helen Chandler as Joan Allan 
 Gilbert Emery as Major Nelson
 Lennox Pawle as Lord Bardell
 Lumsden Hare as Judge Allan 
 Billy Bevan as Tom Berry 
 Daphne Pollard as Minnie
 Joyce Compton as Peggy
 Percy Challenger as Charles, the butler

Production

In a period when studios were adapting to the new "sound" technology, The Sky Hawk successfully utilized sound throughout the production. One of the most impressive aspects of the film was Special Effects Coordinator Ralph Hammeras creating a large-scale miniature of the city of London in the Fox Studios airfield hangar built for Hell's Angels (1930).  Hammeras also created special mechanical effects, utilizing miniature aircraft and a model Zeppelin in the climatic Zeppelin raid sequence. Blystone's brother Jasper was the assistant director on The Sky Hawk.

The production was completed over a five-week period beginning in August 1928. Location shooting took place at Ross Army Air Field in Arcadia, California. For The Sky Hawk, the base was converted into a Royal Air Force air base, with a small group of Thomas-Morse Scout, Laird Swallow and Travel Air biplanes "dressed up" as British fighters.

Reception
The Sky Hawk premiered on December 11, 1929, at the Gaiety Theater in New York to positive reviews. Mordaunt Hall of The New York Times praised the film, noting: "A melodrama of the skies which has not been equaled in its adroit handling, its competent acting, its authentic atmospheric effects, or the tonal quality of the voices of the participants was launched last night by William Fox at the Gaiety Theatre."

References

Notes

Citations

Bibliography

 Farmer, James H. Celluloid Wings: The Impact of Movies on Aviation. Blue Ridge Summit, Pennsylvania: Tab Books Inc., 1984. .
 Orriss, Bruce W. When Hollywood Ruled the Skies: The Aviation Film Classics of World War I. Los Angeles: Aero Associates, 2013. .
 Wynne, H. Hugh. The Motion Picture Stunt Pilots and Hollywood's Classic Aviation Movies. Missoula, Montana: Pictorial Histories Publishing Co., 1987. .

External links

Answers.Com  The Sky Hawk
Galeon.com Ralph Hammeras photo of London miniature made for The Sky Hawk
Dust jackets for the novelization by Guy Fowler of The Sky Hawk

1929 films
Fox Film films
American aviation films
American black-and-white films
Films directed by John G. Blystone
Films set in London
Films set in England
Films set in the 1910s
World War I aviation films
American adventure films
1929 adventure films
1920s English-language films
1920s American films